Tuberopeplus chilensis is a species of beetle in the family Cerambycidae. It was described by Stephan von Breuning in 1947. It is known from Chile.

References

Phacellini
Beetles described in 1947
Endemic fauna of Chile